Roxane (minor planet designation: 317 Roxane) is an asteroid from the asteroid belt approximately 19 km in diameter. It was discovered by Auguste Charlois from Nice on September 11, 1891. The name was chosen by F. Bidschof, an assistant at the Vienna Observatory, at Charlois' request; Bidschof chose to name it after Roxana, the wife of Alexander the Great, and at first used the spelling "Roxana".

In 2008, a team identified Roxane as the closest known spectroscopic match for the Peña Blanca Spring meteorite that landed in a swimming pool in Texas in 1946. There is a possibility, therefore, that 317 Roxane is from the same parent object as this meteorite.

In 2009, a team using the Gemini North adaptive optics telescope discovered a moon orbiting Roxane. The moon is named Olympias, after the mother of Alexander the Great who was the king of Macedonia and husband of Roxana. Prior to its naming, the moon was provisionally named . It measures 5 km in diameter and orbits 245 km from Roxane, completing one orbit every 13 days.

See also
 Aubrite
 E-type asteroid

References

External links 
 http://www.meteorite.com/meteorite-gallery/meteorite-pages/Pena_Blanca_Spring.htm
 http://www.minsocam.org/ammin/AM32/AM32_354.pdf
 Asteroids with Satellites, Robert Johnston, johnstonsarchive.net
 
 

000317
Discoveries by Auguste Charlois
Named minor planets
000317
000317
000317
18910911